Peter Douglas Keisler (born October 13, 1960) is an American lawyer whose 2006 nomination by President George W. Bush to the United States Court of Appeals for the District of Columbia Circuit became embroiled in partisan controversy. He is a partner at the firm of Sidley Austin in Washington, D.C., and used to be the Assistant Attorney General in charge of the Civil Division at the U.S. Department of Justice. Upon the resignation of Attorney General Alberto Gonzales, until November 9, 2007, he was also the Acting Attorney General of the United States.

Background
Keisler was born in Hempstead, New York. A 1977 graduate from George W. Hewlett High School in Long Island, he went to Yale University both for undergraduate and law school.  As an undergraduate, Keisler was the Chairman of the Party of the Right (Yale) and the Speaker of the Yale Political Union. He graduated magna cum laude from Yale College in 1981 and then entered Yale Law School. In 1982, he helped to co-found the Federalist Society, a conservative thinktank. He received his J.D. in 1985.  After law school, Keisler clerked for Judge Robert Bork on the D.C. Circuit from 1985 to 1986. After this clerkship, he joined the Office of Legal Counsel under President Ronald Reagan. There, he worked on the failed Supreme Court nomination of his former boss, Robert Bork, and then on successful Supreme Court nomination of Anthony Kennedy. Afterward, Keisler served as a clerk for Justice Kennedy in 1988. One of his fellow clerks during that year was Miguel Estrada, another conservative nominee to the D.C. Circuit whose nomination was controversially filibustered by the Democrats in 2003.

After finishing his Supreme Court clerkship, Keisler became a partner in the Washington, D.C. office of Sidley Austin. He specialized in general and appellate litigation and telecommunications law, and argued before the U.S. Supreme Court and numerous federal Courts of Appeals. In 2002, he left his job in order to join the Department of Justice. He joined the Department on June 24, 2002, as the Principal Deputy Associate Attorney General and Acting Associate Attorney General.

Peter Keisler was sworn in as the Civil Division's Assistant Attorney General on July 1, 2003. Keisler was involved in defending the Bush Administration's policies in the Global War on Terror. He has also represented the government in defense of laws protecting access to abortion clinics and imposing requirements on telemarketing companies.

In probably the most well-known case he handled, Keisler argued on behalf of the government in Hamdan v. Rumsfeld in the D.C. Circuit and participated in both the case's appellate and Supreme Court briefs. In addition, he personally led the team that responded to a legal appeal by Sabin Willett, the lawyer for the seventeen remaining Uyghur captives in Guantanamo, that tested the use of a provision of the Detainee Treatment Act in terms of whether or not captives could challenge the rulings of their Combatant Status Review Tribunals.

On September 6, 2007, Keisler announced his resignation from the Department of Justice in order to "spend time with his family."
On September 17, 2007, President Bush announced that Keisler had agreed to remain at the Department of Justice as Acting Attorney General until the Senate confirmation of a new Attorney General; Bush also announced the nomination of Michael Mukasey for Attorney General at the same time.

D.C. Circuit nomination under Bush
Originally, Keisler, a resident of Bethesda, Maryland and a practising lawyer in Washington, D.C., was considered for a Maryland seat on the U.S. Court of Appeals for the Fourth Circuit during the spring of 2001. Maryland's two Democratic senators, Paul Sarbanes and Barbara Mikulski, however, blocked the White House from making the nomination on the grounds that Keisler did not have strong enough ties to the Maryland legal community.

Keisler was later nominated for a position on the D.C. Circuit on June 29, 2006 by President George W. Bush to fill a seat vacated by John Roberts, whom Bush appointed Chief Justice of the United States in 2005. At the time, the 109th Senate was controlled by the Republican Party. On August 1, 2006, he received a hearing before the Senate Judiciary Committee. The Senate on September 29, 2006 returned the nomination to the President without acting on it, prior to adjourning for the 2006 elections,  on September 30, 2006.

After the 2006 midterm congressional elections  (in which the Democrats reclaimed control of the Senate), President Bush renominated Keisler on November 15, 2006. The Senate returned the nomination to Bush on December 9, 2006 without acting on the nomination, before the 109th Congress's final adjournment. President Bush renominated Keisler on January 9, 2007 for consideration by the Senate during the 110th Congress. The Democratic leadership of the Senate Judiciary Committee, however, refused to act on the nomination.

It was reported at the time that the Democrats in the Senate did not want to confirm Keisler for four basic reasons. First, he was a co-founder of the Federalist Society, a conservative legal group which many Democrats saw as seeking to control the federal judiciary. He had been on its board of directors from 1983 until 2000. Second, he clerked for Robert Bork, a controversial Republican judge whose nomination to the Supreme Court was embroiled in controversy before being rejected in 1987 by a Senate controlled by the Democrats. Third, during Keisler's tenure at the United States Department of Justice, he was instrumental in defending some of the most controversial policies of Republican President George W. Bush concerning the Global War on Terror. Finally, he was seen as being a possible Republican contender to the Supreme Court.

Current life 

On March 18, 2008, it was announced that Keisler would be returning to his former position as a partner of Sidley Austin as a global coordinator of the firm's appellate practice in its Washington, D.C. office. On October 21, 2008, Sidley Austin announced that Keisler would be joining the firm's Executive Committee, the committee that exercises general authority over the affairs of the firm.

Keisler and his wife, Susan, have three children; Sydelle, Alex and Philip. Philip plays ultimate frisbee for Washington University in St Louis.

See also 
 List of law clerks of the Supreme Court of the United States (Seat 1)
 George W. Bush judicial appointment controversies
 George W. Bush Supreme Court candidates

References

External links
 U.S. Department of Justice resume
 U.S. Department of Justice brief biography
 White House biography: Judicial Nominations: Peter D. Keisler
 
 McLure, Jason "Has Time Softened D.C. Circuit Nominee Peter Keisler's Partisan Edges?" Legal Times. August 21, 2006.
 Presidential Nomination: Peter Douglas Keisler

|-

1960 births
Dismissal of U.S. attorneys controversy
George W. Bush administration personnel
George W. Hewlett High School alumni
Law clerks of the Supreme Court of the United States
Living people
New York (state) Republicans
People from The Five Towns, New York
United States Assistant Attorneys General for the Civil Division
United States Associate Attorneys General
Yale Law School alumni
Maryland Republicans
People associated with Sidley Austin
Federalist Society members